Robert Augustus Nelson (born May 17, 1964) is an American former professional baseball first baseman. He played parts of five seasons in Major League Baseball (MLB), from 1986 to 1990, for the Oakland Athletics and San Diego Padres.

References

External links

1964 births
Living people
American expatriate baseball players in Canada
Baseball players from California
Cornell Big Red baseball players
Huntsville Stars players
Idaho Falls A's players
Las Vegas Stars (baseball) players
Madison Muskies players
Major League Baseball first basemen
Minot Rattlers players
Mt. SAC Mounties baseball players
Oakland Athletics players
Phoenix Firebirds players
Portland Beavers players
San Diego Padres players
Tacoma Tigers players
Tucson Toros players
Tulsa Drillers players
Vancouver Canadians players